Jorge Venustiano González Ilescas (born 30 December 1956) is a Mexican politician from the Institutional Revolutionary Party. He has served as Deputy of the LIV and LXI Legislatures of the Mexican Congress representing Oaxaca.

References

1956 births
Living people
People from Oaxaca City
Institutional Revolutionary Party politicians
21st-century Mexican politicians
Deputies of the LXI Legislature of Mexico
Members of the Chamber of Deputies (Mexico) for Oaxaca